Salmond's Muir is a hamlet in the council area of Angus, Scotland. The junction of the A92 at Salmond's Muir forms the main route to the villages of Panbride, East Haven, Balmirmer and Scryne.

Salmond's Muir is recorded in documents of the Commissioners of the Guardians of Scotland from 1286, in which a dispute over ownership of the land was settled with the land being determined as property of Christiana of Maule.

References

See also
Carnoustie

Villages in Angus, Scotland